The 2019 Loyola Marymount Lions men's soccer team represented Loyola Marymount University during the 2019 NCAA Division I men's soccer season and the 2019 West Coast Conference men's soccer season. The regular season began on August 30 and concluded on November 16. It was the program's 41st season fielding a men's varsity soccer team, and their 32nd season in the West Coast Conference. The 2019 season was Paul Krumpe's twenty-second year as head coach for the program.

Roster

Schedule 

Source:

|-
!colspan=6 style=""| Non-conference regular season
|-

|-
!colspan=6 style=""| West Coast Conference regular season
|-

|-
!colspan=6 style=""| NCAA Tournament
|-

References 

2019
Loyola Marymount Lions
Loyola Marymount Lions
Loyola Marymount Lions men's soccer
Loyola Marymount Lions